Petre Nicolae is a Romanian actor, the star of Pas în doi (1985).

References

External links

Romanian male film actors
Living people
Year of birth missing (living people)
Place of birth missing (living people)
20th-century Romanian male actors